Manfred Hermann Wörner (24 September 1934 in Stuttgart-Bad Cannstatt – 13 August 1994 in Brussels) was a German politician and diplomat. He served as the defense minister of West Germany between 1982 and 1988. He then served as the seventh Secretary General of NATO from 1988 to 1994. His term as Secretary General saw the end of the Cold War and the German reunification. Whilst serving in that position, he was diagnosed with cancer, but, in spite of his illness, continued serving until his final days.

Family 
He grew up in his grandfather's house in Stuttgart-Bad Cannstatt and attended the Johannes-Kepler-Gymnasium there. He was married to Elfie Wörner, who was supporting several German army related humanitarian agencies, and who died of a tumor on 4 July 2006.

Education 
After graduation in 1953 he studied law at Heidelberg, Paris, and Munich. He closed his studies 1957 with the first and 1961 the second Staatsexamen. He got his Dr. jur. in 1961 writing about International law. Afterwards he worked for the administration of Baden-Württemberg. He was a county official for Oehringen until 1962, for the Baden-Württemberg Landtag until 1965 and the County Göppingen. Wörner was a jet pilot and reserve officer in the Luftwaffe.

Political career 
Wörner was a member of the German CDU and was elected to the German parliament, representing Göppingen.

On 4 October 1982 he was appointed Federal Minister of Defence in Helmut Kohl's government. Wörner played an important role in defending NATO's decision to deploy intermediate-range ballistic missiles IRBM after arms reduction talks with the Soviet Union to reverse Soviet deployment of its SS-20 intermediate-range ballistic missiles IRBM from the years before.

In 1983, Wörner faced criticism due to the scandal surrounding German General Günter Kießling. The German military secret service had accused Kießling of being homosexual—this was later revealed to be a case of mistaken identity—and Wörner had ordered Kießling's early retirement, as homosexuality was considered a security risk at the time. Kießling insisted on disciplinary procedures against himself and eventually achieved his reinstatement. Wörner accepted political responsibility for the affair and on 18 May 1984 offered his resignation, which was rejected by German Chancellor Helmut Kohl.

Secretary-General of NATO (1988-1994)
In December 1987, the 16 members of NATO elected Wörner Secretary General. He was the first German to be appointed to that position. Resigning from his post in the German government, he took office on 1 July 1988.

An address given by Wörner in 1990 to the Bremer Tabak Collegium became a subject of a controversy when Vladimir Putin cited it in his 2007 speech at 43rd Munich Conference on Security Policy to claim that NATO made a promise not to expand eastward after the end of the Cold War.

Wörner executed his duties as NATO Secretary General despite severe illness and until his death from colorectal cancer in 1994. He is buried at the cemetery of Hohenstaufen nearby Göppingen.

Personal life 
In December 1972 Wörner married Anna-Maria Caesar. From 1982 until his death he was married with Elfie Wörner, née Reinsch (1941–2006).

Medal 

Since 1996, the Ministry of Defense has awarded the Manfred Wörner Medal on an annual basis to honour public figures who have rendered "special meritorious service to peace and freedom in Europe".

Since then it was given to:
 1996 Richard Holbrooke, US diplomat and Special Envoy in Bosnia and Kosovo
 1997 Ewald-Heinrich von Kleist-Schmenzin, publisher and initiator of the Munich Conference on Security Policy
 1998 Dr. Gerd Wagner (postmortem), for the implementation of the Dayton Agreement
 1999 Dr. Janusz Onyszkiewicz, Minister of Defense of Poland
 2000 Elizabeth Pond, American Journalist
 2001 Karsten Voigt, Coordinator at the German State Department for the German-American Cooperation
 2002 Javier Solana, the EU's foreign policy chief and former Secretary General of NATO
 2003 Prof. Dr. Catherine McArdle Kelleher, U.S. Naval War College and former Head of the Aspen Institute Berlin
 2005 Hans Koschnick
 2006 Christian Schwarz-Schilling
 2007 Martti Ahtisaari
 2009 Jörg Schönbohm
 2011 Hans-Friedrich von Ploetz, German diplomat

See also 

 Manfred Wörner Seminar
 Manfred Wörner Foundation
 NATO Declassified - Manfred Wörner (biography)

Honours 
The Manfred Wörner Seminar, a security-policy information seminar of the German Federal Ministry of Defense for young civilian executive personnel from Germany, the United States and other European nations, is named after Manfred Wörner to honour his merits on transatlantic dialogue and understanding.

Wörner Gap on Livingston Island in the South Shetland Islands, Antarctica is named after Dr. Wörner in recognition of his contribution to European unification.

References 

1934 births
1994 deaths
Politicians from Stuttgart
Secretaries General of NATO
Defence ministers of Germany
Members of the Bundestag for Baden-Württemberg
Members of the Bundestag 1987–1990
Members of the Bundestag 1983–1987
Members of the Bundestag 1980–1983
Members of the Bundestag 1976–1980
Members of the Bundestag 1972–1976
Members of the Bundestag 1969–1972
Members of the Bundestag 1965–1969
Deaths from cancer in Belgium
Deaths from colorectal cancer
German Air Force pilots
Grand Crosses 1st class of the Order of Merit of the Federal Republic of Germany
Recipients of the Order of Merit of Baden-Württemberg
Members of the Bundestag for the Christian Democratic Union of Germany